This page details statistics of the CONCACAF League.  These statistics concern all seasons since 2017.

General performances

By club

By nation

All-time table
 As of 14 November 2022

Number of participations
A total of 56 clubs from 15 national associations participated in the CONCACAF League.

Notes

By semi-final appearances

Year in bold indicates team reached finals that season.

Matches

Biggest home wins
6 goals:
 5 November 2020:  Olimpia 6–0 Managua 
 2 August 2022:  Pacific FC 6–0 Waterhouse 
5 goals:
 22 January 2021:  Saprissa 5–0 Arcahaie 
 4 August 2022:  Municipal 5–0 Atlético Vega Real 
4 goals:
 1 August 2017:  Santos de Guápiles 6–2 San Juan Jabloteh 
 1 August 2019:  Alianza 5–1 San Francisco 
 18 August 2021:  Santos de Guápiles 5–1 Verdes

Biggest away wins
6 goals:
 14 September 2017:  Plaza Amador 1–7 Olimpia 
 21 September 2021:  Inter Moengotapoe 0–6 Olimpia 
4 goals:
 1 August 2018:  Diriangén 0–4 Universitario 
 30 August 2018:  Walter Ferretti 0–4 Tauro 
 28 July 2022:  Atlético Vega Real 0–4 Municipal

Biggest two leg wins
9 goals:
 2022:  Municipal 9–0 Atlético Vega Real  (preliminary round)
6 goals:
 2017:  Olimpia 8–2 Plaza Amador  (quarter-finals)
 2018:  Universitario 7–1 Diriangén  (round of 16)
 2018:  Tauro 7–1 Walter Ferretti  (quarter-finals)
 2022:  Pacific FC 6–0 Waterhouse  (preliminary round)
5 goals:
 2017:  Santos de Guápiles 8–3 San Juan Jabloteh  (round of 16)
 2019:  Alianza 6–1 San Francisco  (preliminary round)
 2021:  Santos de Guápiles 6–1 Verdes  (preliminary round)

Decided by penalty shoot-out
Final:
 26 October 2017:  Santos de Guápiles 1–1 agg. (1–4) Olimpia 
Semi-finals:
 20 January 2021:  Alajuelense 0–0 (5–4) Olimpia 
Quarter-finals:
 1 December 2020:  Arcahaie 1–1 (4–2) Forge FC 
Round of 16:
 8 August 2017:  Real Estelí 1–1 agg. (3–4) Águila 
 9 August 2017:  Plaza Amador 1–1 agg. (5–4) Portmore United 
 8 August 2018:  Walter Ferretti 1–1 agg. (4–1) Club Franciscain 
 9 August 2018:  Portmore United 3–3 agg. (7–6) Santos de Guápiles 
 27 August 2019:  San Carlos 0–0 agg. (4–2) Santa Tecla 
 29 August 2019:  Herediano 2–2 agg. (6–7) Waterhouse
 3 November 2020:  Marathón 1–1 (4–3) Antigua GFC 
 4 November 2020:  Alianza 1–1 (3–4) Motagua 
 29 September 2021:  Real Estelí 2–2 (4–5) Marathón 
 23 August 2022:  Herediano 1–1 (6–5) Pacific FC 
Preliminary round:
 20 October 2020:  FAS 1–1 (4–5) Managua 
 21 October 2020:  Independiente 0–0 (2–4) Antigua GFC 
 22 October 2020:  Motagua 2–2 (15–14) Comunicaciones 
Play-off round:
 9 December 2020:  Motagua 2–2 (2–4) Real Estelí

Same nation encounters
 2019:  Comunicaciones 2–1 agg. Guastatoya  (round of 16)
 2020:  Olimpia 2–0 Motagua  (quarter-finals)
 2020:  Alajuelense 3–2 Saprissa  (final)
 2021:  Marathón 0–4 Motagua  (quarter-finals)
 2021:  Comunicaciones 3–1 agg. Guastatoya  (semi-finals)
 2022:  Sporting San Miguelito 1–2 agg. Tauro  (round of 16)
 2022:  Olimpia 1–0 agg. Motagua  (semi-finals)

Awards

Golden Ball
 2017:  Michaell Chirinos (Olimpia)
 2018:  Yendrick Ruiz (Herediano)
 2019:  Johan Venegas (Saprissa)
 2020:  Alexander López (Alajuelense)
 2021:  Juan Anangonó (Comunicaciones)
 2022:  Michaell Chirinos (Olimpia)

Golden Boot
 2017:  Roger Rojas (Olimpia, 5 goals)
 2018:  Román Castillo (Motagua, 5 goals)
 2019:  Johan Venegas (Saprissa, 7 goals)
 2020:  Johan Venegas (Saprissa, 6 goals)
 2021:  Juan Anangonó, (Comunicaciones, 6 goals)
 2022:  Ramiro Rocca, (Real España, 6 goals)

Golden Glove
 2017:  Bryan Morales (Santos de Guápiles)
 2018:  Leonel Moreira (Herediano)
 2019:  Jonathan Rougier (Motagua)
 2020:  Leonel Moreira (Alajuelense)
 2021:  Kevin Moscoso (Comunicaciones) 
 2022:  Leonel Moreira (Alajuelense)

Best Young Player
 2017:  Kevin Álvarez (Olimpia)
 2018:  Jimmy Marín (Herediano)
 2019:  Manfred Ugalde (Saprissa)
 2020:  Fernán Faerron (Alajuelense)
 2021:  Oscar Santis (Comunicaciones)
 2022:  Aarón Suárez (Alajuelense)

Fair Play Award
 2017:  Santos de Guápiles
 2018:  Motagua
 2019:  Saprissa
 2020:  Alajuelense
 2021:  Comunicaciones
 2022:  Alajuelense

See also
 CONCACAF Champions' Cup and Champions League records and statistics

References

International club association football competition records and statistics
CONCACAF League